Free molecular flow describes the fluid dynamics of gas where the mean free path of the molecules is larger than the size of the chamber or of the object under test. For tubes/objects of the size of several cm, this means pressures well below 10−3 mbar. This is also called the regime of high vacuum, or even ultra-high vacuum. This is opposed to viscous flow encountered at higher pressures. The presence of free molecular flow can be calculated, at least in estimation, with the Knudsen number (Kn). If Kn > 10, the system is in free molecular flow, also known as Knudsen flow.

In free molecular flow, the pressure of the remaining gas can be considered as effectively zero. Thus, boiling points do not depend on the residual pressure. The flow can be considered to be individual particles moving in straight lines. Practically, the "vapor" cannot move around bends or into other spaces behind obstacles, as they simply hit the tube wall. This implies conventional pumps cannot be used, as they rely on viscous flow and fluid pressure. Instead, special sorption pumps, ion pumps and momentum transfer pumps i.e. turbomolecular pumps are used.

Free molecular flow occurs in various processes such as molecular distillation, ultra-high vacuum equipment such as particle accelerators, and naturally in outer space.

The definition of a free molecular flow depends on the distance scale under consideration. For example, in the interplanetary medium, the plasma is in a free molecular flow regime in scales less than 1 AU; thus, planets and moons are effectively under particle bombardment. However, on larger scales, fluid-like behavior is observed, because the probability of collisions between particles becomes significant.

See also

References

Fluid dynamics